Albert Marshall  (born to John and Mary (née Cassar) on 29 December 1947, the eldest of six siblings, in Attard, Malta) is a Maltese–Australian senior leader, board member, director, and author in the Maltese language.

Biography 
Marshall attended secondary school at the Archbishops' Seminary in Floriana, Malta. He then studied at the University of Malta and the London Academy of Music and Dramatic Art. He obtained a Master of Arts degree in Communication Studies from Victoria University, Melbourne, Australia.

Marshall distinguished himself as a theatre and television director, playwright, poet, television presenter and executive producer.

Marshall's literary and theatrical career began during the 1960s. During this time, Marshall was a founding member of the Moviment Qawmien Letterarju.

After a two-year stint living, working and studying in London, Marshall returned to Malta in 1971 and worked in Maltese electronic media as well as in Maltese theatrical arts. In 1979 he was appointed the first Maltese principal of the Manoel Theatre Academy of Dramatic Arts (MTADA). Also in 1979, Marshall directed the original, and highly controversial, television adaptation of 's seminal drama Il-Madonna taċ-Ċoqqa, with actress Jane Marshall (Albert Marshall's wife) playing the part of the protagonist, Rita.

In January 1981, Marshall emigrated to Australia with wife Jane and their young children. He worked in Australian television, theatre and radio, obtained a master's degree in Communication Studies from Victoria University, and co-founded the Harmonic 65 Culture Club, using it as a vehicle to produce and direct for mainstream Australian media. Marshall was particularly active in the Maltese-Australian community, pushing for the promotion of the Maltese Language in Australia, given its sizeable expatriate population. Marshall was also named chairman of the panel responsible for the Australian national examination in Maltese language. He became the first Maltese person to direct at the Sydney Opera House, directing Mary Spiteri in concert.

On his return to Malta in November 1995, Marshall was engaged by the University of Malta to lecture in Communication Studies and lead the Distance Learning Programme at the Radju tal-Università. He was appointed chief executive officer of the Public Broadcasting Services (PBS) in 1997, and, three years later, moved to One Productions Limited where he worked as consultant and, eventually, as chief executive officer.

In 2004, Marshall moved to Luxembourg to work as a translator and Language Administrator with the European Commission. He was appointed fonctionnaire of the commission, and returned to Malta in 2009.

Marshall's literary works have been published in Australia, Canada and Malta.

He currently holds the position of Deputy Chairman of Public Broadcasting Services, as well as the Executive Chair of the Arts Council Malta.

Honours

In December 2018 Marshall was appointed Member of the Order of Merit (MOM) by the President of Malta.

In November 2021 Marshall was appointed Fellow of the Royal Society of Arts (FRSA).

Personal life 
Marshall married actress Jane (née Micallef) in 1972, and they have two children, Mark (born 1973) and Kristina (born 1976).

Publications
Marshall has published a wide selection of poems in books and anthologies. His book, Jumping Puddles, was awarded Best Book in the Poetry category by Maltese National Book Council in 2012.

 Dħaħen fl-Imħuħ – published 1967
 Rumminiet Jittewbu minn wara s-Sejjieħ – published 1971
 Poeziji ta' Mbabba – published 1981
 Diaspora: poeziji 1967–1996 – published 1997 
 Jumping Puddles – published 2011 
 Poeziji (1964–2019) – published 2019

References

Living people
1947 births
People from Attard
Maltese expatriates in Australia
Maltese male poets
20th-century Maltese poets
21st-century Maltese poets
Academic staff of the University of Malta
Maltese dramatists and playwrights
Maltese songwriters
Maltese–English translators
Maltese translators